Botanical gardens in Russia have collections consisting entirely of Russia native and endemic species; most have a collection that include plants from around the world. There are botanical gardens and arboreta in all states and territories of Russia, most are administered by local governments, some are privately owned.
 Botanical Garden of V.L. Komarov Botany Institute RAS (BIN), Saint Petersburg
 Botanic Garden of the Irkutsk State UniversityIrkutsk
 Botanical Garden of Tver State University
 Botanical Garden of Academy of Sciences, Moscow
 Botanical Garden of Moscow State University, Moscow
 Taganrog Botanical Garden, Taganrog
 Central Siberian Botanic Garden, Novosibirsk
 List of Botanical Gardens and Arboreta of Russia
 VILAR Botanical Garden, Moscow
 Southern Federal University's botanical garden, Rostov-on-Don
 Sechenov Botanical Garden, First Moscow State Medical University

References 

Russia
Botanical gardens
Botanical gardens